Gorey is a market town in north County Wexford, Ireland.

Gorey may also refer to:

People
 Alicia Gorey, an Australian journalist and news presenter
 Denis Gorey, an Irish politician
 Edward Gorey, an American writer and artist
 Kevin Gorey, American epidemiologist and social worker
 İhap Hulusi Görey, a Turkish graphic artist
 Yavuz Görey, Turkish sculptor

Other uses
 Locations in the market town in north County Wexford, Ireland
 Gorey Community School
 Gorey Guardian, a local newspaper published in that town
 Gorey railway station, in that town
 Gorey RFC, an Irish rugby team based in that town
 Gorey, Jersey, a village in the parishes of St. Martin and Grouville on the east coast of Jersey
 Mont Orgueil, also known as Gorey Castle, that overlooks the harbour of Gorey, Jersey
 Gorey (Parliament of Ireland constituency), a constituency represented in the Irish House of Commons to 1800
 Gorey, County Tyrone, a townland in County Tyrone, Northern Ireland

See also
Jouri, an Arabic female name